Anne-Marie Lambert (born 2 June 1945) is a Swedish gymnast. She competed in six events at the 1964 Summer Olympics.

References

1945 births
Living people
Swedish female artistic gymnasts
Olympic gymnasts of Sweden
Gymnasts at the 1964 Summer Olympics
Sportspeople from Stockholm
20th-century Swedish women